P129 may refer to:

 Papyrus 129, a biblical manuscript
 , a patrol boat of the Turkish Navy
 P129, a state regional road in Latvia